The 2012 United States Senate election in Rhode Island was on November 6, 2012, alongside the presidential election, elections to the United States House of Representatives, and various state and local elections.

Incumbent Democratic Senator Sheldon Whitehouse was reelected to a second term in a landslide by a 30% margin of 65% - 35%.

Background 
In the 2006 Senate election, former Attorney General of Rhode Island Sheldon Whitehouse defeated one-term Republican incumbent Lincoln Chafee. Chafee had been appointed to the Senate in 1999 when his father, the incumbent Senator John Chafee died. He then won election to a first term in 2000. Whitehouse won 53.52% of the vote in 2006.

Democratic primary

Candidates

Declared 
 Sheldon Whitehouse, incumbent U.S. Senator

Unsuccessful 
 Todd Giroux, contractor and Independent candidate for governor in 2010

Results

Republican primary

Candidates

Declared 
 Barry Hinckley, president and co-founder of software company Bullhorn

Declined 
 Joseph Almond, Lincoln town administrator
 Scott Avedisian, Mayor of Warwick
 Donald Carcieri, former Governor of Rhode Island
 Giovanni Cicione, former Chairman of the Rhode Island Republican Party
 Brendan Doherty, former Rhode Island state police superintendent (running for a U.S. House seat)
 Leo Fontaine, Mayor of Woonsocket
 Allan Fung, Mayor of Cranston
 John Robitaille, businessman and nominee for Governor in 2010

Polling

Results

Independent

Candidates

Declined 
 Alan Hassenfeld, former Hasbro CEO

General election

Predictions

Debates 
Complete video of debate, October 24, 2012 - YouTube

Polling

Results

See also 
 2012 United States Senate elections
 2012 United States House of Representatives elections in Rhode Island

References

External links 
 Rhode Island Board of Elections
 Candidate issue positions at OnTheIssues
 Campaign contributions at OpenSecrets.org
 Outside spending at Sunlight Foundation

Official campaign websites (Archived)
 Barry Hinckley for U.S. Senate
 Sheldon Whitehouse for U.S. Senate

2012 Rhode Island elections
Rhode Island
2012